Gypospirifer condor is an extinct species of articulate brachiopod fossils belonging to the family Trigonotretidae. They were stationary epifaunal suspension feeders.

Fossils of this species have been found in the sediments of the Carboniferous and Permian ages (from 298.9 to 279.5  million years ago).

References

Prehistoric brachiopods
Spiriferida